The Theban Tomb TT59 is located in Sheikh Abd el-Qurna, part of the Theban Necropolis, on the west bank of the Nile, opposite to Luxor.

It is the tomb of Qen, First Prophet of Mut, Lady of Asher, during the reign of Thutmose III.

See also
 List of Theban tombs

References

Buildings and structures completed in the 13th century BC
Theban tombs